Chemokine (C-C motif) ligand 24 (CCL24) also known as myeloid progenitor inhibitory factor 2 (MPIF-2) or eosinophil chemotactic protein 2 (eotaxin-2) is a protein that in humans is encoded by the CCL24 gene. This gene is located on human chromosome 7.

Function 

CCL24 is a small cytokine belonging to the CC chemokine family. CCL24 interacts with chemokine receptor CCR3 to induce chemotaxis in eosinophils.  This chemokine is also strongly chemotactic for resting T lymphocytes and slightly chemotactic for neutrophils.

Clinical significance 
Elevated levels of eotaxin-2 has been seen in patients with aspirin-exacerbated respiratory disease (AERD), such as asthma. People with lower plasma levels of eotaxin-2 have not been showing tendency to develop aspirin inducible asthma.

References 

Cytokines